This is an incomplete list of plays for which incidental music has been written.  
A very large number of such works have been written, and to limit the size of this article, only items where the composer and/or the playwright has a specific Wikipedia article should be included.

A
 Abdelazer (Aphra Behn, 1676)
 1695 music by Henry Purcell

 The Acharnians (Aristophanes, 425 BC)
 1914 music by Sir Hubert Parry

 Adrienne Lecouvreur (Eugène Scribe and Ernest Legouvé, 1849)
 music by Anatoly Alexandrov (he later arranged an orchestral suite)

 La adultera penitente (Moreto, adapted by Gregorio Martínez Sierra)
 1917 music by Joaquín Turina

 Advent (August Strindberg)
 music by Heinz Tiessen (died 1971)

 Agamemnon (Aeschylus): Part I of Oresteia (see below)
 L'Aiglon (Edmond Rostand, 1900)
 music by Richard Addinsell

 Aladdin (Adam Oehlenschläger, 1805, music Carl Nielsen, 1919)
 1918-19 music by Carl Nielsen, FS. 89

 The Alchemist (Ben Jonson, 1610)
 1710 music by George Frideric Handel

 Alice in Wonderland (adapted for the stage by Eva Le Gallienne from Lewis Carroll's Alice's Adventures in Wonderland; 1933)
 music by Richard Addinsell

 L'Alouette (Jean Anouilh, 1952)
 music by Leonard Bernstein

 Amal, or La Lettre du roi (Rabindranath Tagore, trans. André Gide)
 1936 music by Darius Milhaud, Op. 156

 Andromaque (Jean Racine, 1667)
 1903 music by Camille Saint-Saëns

 L’annonce faite à Marie (Paul Claudel, 1910)
 1932 music by Darius Milhaud, Op. 117 (also 1942)
 1942 music by Darius Milhaud, Op. 231 (also 1932)

 The Annunciation (La anunciación; Tomás Borrás)
 1924 music by Joaquín Turina

 Antigone (Sophocles, 442 BC)
 1841 music by Felix Mendelssohn
 1893 music by Camille Saint-Saëns
 1920 music by Willem Pijper (rev. 1922, 1926)
 music by Heinz Tiessen (died 1971)

 Antony and Cleopatra (William Shakespeare, c. 1605)
 1920 music by Florent Schmitt, Op. 69 (to André Gide's French version Antoine et Cléopâtre)
 1937 music by Virgil Thomson
 1944 music by Leevi Madetoja, Op. 80
 music by Quincy Porter (died 1966)

 À quoi rêvent les jeunes filles (Alfred de Musset, 1832)
 1944 music by Henri Sauguet

 Ariane et Barbe-Bleue (Maurice Maeterlinck, 1899)
 1920 music by Anatoly Nikolayevich Alexandrov  (he later arranged an orchestral suite)

 L'Arlésienne (Alphonse Daudet, 1872)
 music by Georges Bizet.  This is best known in the form of two orchestral suites, one compiled by Bizet himself, the other by Ernest Guiraud after Bizet's death.

 The Ascent of F6 (W. H. Auden and Christopher Isherwood, 1936)
 1937 music by Benjamin Britten

 L'Assassinat du Duc de Guise (aka La Mort du duc de Guise; Henri Lavedan, 1908)
 music by Camille Saint-Saëns, Op. 128; this was music for a film, not a staged play as such, and is generally considered one of the world's first film scores

 As You Like It (William Shakespeare, c. 1600)
 1922 music by Roger Quilter
 1931 music by Ernst Toch
 music by Johan Halvorsen (Livet i skogen, Op. 33; died 1935)
 1938 music by Ildebrando Pizzetti

 Athalie (Jean Racine, 1691)
 1785 music by Johann Abraham Peter Schulz
 1786 music by Georg Joseph "Abbé" Vogler
 music by François Joseph Gossec (died 1829)
 1845 music by Felix Mendelssohn
 1946 music by Frank Martin

 Attila (Laurence Binyon)
 1907 music by Charles Villiers Stanford, Op. 102

B
 The Bacchae (aka The Bacchantes; Euripides, posth. 405 BC)
 1924 music by Willem Pijper
 1926 music by Ernst Toch (R. Viertel's version)
 music by Anatoly Alexandrov

 The Bagpiper of Strakonice (Strakonický dudák; Josef Kajetán Tyl)
 1926 music by Josef Bohuslav Foerster, Op. 120

 Le Baiser (Théodore de Banville)
 1888 music by Paul Vidal

 Le Bal des Voleurs (Thieves' Carnival; Jean Anouilh)
 music by Darius Milhaud, Op. 192

 Becket (Alfred, Lord Tennyson)
 1893 music by Charles Villiers Stanford, Op. 48

 The Bedbug (Vladimir Mayakovsky, 1929)
 1929 music by Dmitri Shostakovich, Op. 19

 Belshazzar's Feast (Hjalmar Procopé, 1906)
 1906 music by Jean Sibelius, Op. 51

 Bérénice (Jean Racine, 1670)
 music by Marcel Samuel-Rousseau

 Bertran de Born (Jean Valmy-Baisse, 1936)
 1936 music by Darius Milhaud, Op. 152a (in 1937 he reworked the music into his Suite provencale. Op. 152b)

 The Betrothal (Maurice Maeterlinck; sequel to The Blue Bird)
 1921 music by Armstrong Gibbs

 The Birds (Aristophanes, 414 BC)
 1883 music by Sir Hubert Parry
 1901 music by John Knowles Paine
 1947 music by Goffredo Petrassi
 music by Marios Varvoglis (died 1967)

 The Black Masks (Leonid Andreyev, 1908)
 1923 music by Roger Sessions

 Blaubart (Ludwig Tieck)
 1835 music by Julius Rietz

 The Blue Bird (L'Oiseau bleu; Maurice Maeterlinck, 1908; for the sequel The Blue Bird and the Betrothal, see The Betrothal above)
 1909 music by Norman O'Neill, Op. 37
 1912 music by Engelbert Humperdinck
 music by Leslie Heward (died 1943)

 Boris Godunov (Alexander Pushkin, 1825)
 1934 music by Yuri Shaporin
 1936 music by Sergei Prokofiev, Op. 70 bis

 Le Bourgeois gentilhomme (Molière, 1670)
 1670 ballet music by Jean-Baptiste Lully
 1912 and 1917 music by Richard Strauss, to Hugo von Hofmannsthal's  German versions of the play Der Bürger als Edelmann.  The ending of the play was originally replaced by an opera Ariadne auf Naxos. After the failure of this version, Hofmannsthal reinstated the original ending and commissioned extra music from Strauss, including arrangements of Lully. Strauss published a suite containing most of the music from the two versions.
 1920 music by Karol Szymanowski (Mandragora, ballet-grotesque, Op. 43)
 1927 music by Erwin Schulhoff (exists as a suite)

 Brand (Henrik Ibsen, 1865)
 1928 music by Ture Rangström

 The Bride of Lammermoor (Sir Walter Scott, 1819 - see also Ravenswood)
 music by Norman O'Neill

C
 La cena delle beffe (Sem Benelli, 1909)
 1988 music by Lorenzo Ferrero

 Chitra (Rabindranath Tagore)
 music by Wilhelm Stenhammar (died 1927)

 Christmas Dream (Karácsonyi álom; Géza Gárdonyi)
 1901 music by Béla Szabados

 Christophe Colomb (Paul Claudel)
 1952 music by Darius Milhaud, Op. 318

 Cléopâtre (Victorien Sardou, 1890)
 music by Xavier Leroux

 The Clouds (Aristophanes)
 1905 music by Sir Hubert Parry

 The Comedy of Errors (William Shakespeare, c. 1590)
 1940 music by Yuri Shaporin

 Conquistador (Archibald MacLeish, poem, 1933)
 1952 music by Roberto Gerhard

 Consecration of the House (Carl Meisl)
 1822 music by Ludwig van Beethoven, from The Ruins of Athens

 Coriolanus (William Shakespeare, 1623)
 music by August Söderman (died 1876)
 1901 music by Sir Alexander Mackenzie, Op. 61

 Le Crocodile (Victorien Sardou)
 1886 music by Jules Massenet

 Cyclops (Euripides)
 1925 music by Willem Pijper

 Cymbeline (William Shakespeare, c. 1611)
 music by Robert Johnson, c. 1611
 music by Heinz Tiessen (died 1971)

 Cyrano de Bergerac (Edmond Rostand, 1897)
 1946 music by Paul Bowles

D
 Danton's Death (Georg Büchner, 1835)
 1941 music by Henri Sauguet (Le Mort de Danton; play adapted by Michel J. Arnaud)

 Dear Brutus (J. M. Barrie, 1917)
 1944 music by Francis Poulenc (La Nuit de la Saint-Jean) 

 The Death of Tintagiles (La Mort de Tintagiles; Maurice Maeterlinck, 1894)
 1913 music by Ralph Vaughan Williams

 Déjanire (Louis Gallet)
 1895 music by Camille Saint-Saëns

 Diarmuid and Grania (George Moore and W. B. Yeats, 1901)
 music by Edward Elgar (published as Grania and Diarmid, Op. 42)
1. Introduction and Funeral March
2. Song There are seven that pull the thread

 Dom Juan, or The Feast with the Statue (Dom Juan, ou le Festin de pierre; Molière, 1665)
 1947 music by Henri Sauguet

 Don Carlos (Friedrich Schiller, 1787)
 1933 music by Anatoly Alexandrov (he later arranged an orchestral suite)
 music by Boris Asafyev

 Don Juan (Aleksey Konstantinovich Tolstoy, 1862)
 1892 music by Eduard Nápravník
 music by Nikolay Sokolov (died 1922)

 Don Juan und Faust (Christian Dietrich Grabbe, 1829)
 1925 music by Heinz Tiessen

 A Dream on the Volga (aka The Voyevoda (A Dream on the Volga) (Aleksandr Ostrovsky, 1865)
 1886 music by Pyotr Ilyich Tchaikovsky (for the Domovoi scene; a different work than either his opera or symphonic ballad of the same name)
 
 A Dream Play (Ett drömspel; August Strindberg, 1907)
 1915 music by Emil von Reznicek
 music by Pancho Vladigerov (an orchestral suite, Op. 13, was published in 1926)
 music by Wilhelm Stenhammar (died 1927)
 1942 music by Franz Syberg
 music by Kurt Weill (died 1950)

 The Duchess of Malfi (John Webster, 1614)
 1937 music by Darius Milhaud, Op. 160 (La duchesse d’Amalfi, a French adaptation by Fluchère)
 1945 music by Benjamin Britten

E
 Egmont (Johann Wolfgang von Goethe, 1788)
 1810 music by Ludwig van Beethoven, Op. 84

 Egyptian Nights (Alexander Tairov 1934; based on Alexander Pushkin's unfinished short story)
 music by Sergei Prokofiev (no opus number allocated; a suite was later produced, as Op. 61)

 Elektra (Hugo von Hofmannsthal, 1903)
 music by Alexander Tcherepnin (died 1977)

 Die Ermittlung (Peter Weiss, 1965)
 music by Paul Dessau; played at the Deutsche Akademie der Künste, [East] Berlin 1965 performance
 music by Luigi Nono; played at the Freie Volkbühne, [West] Berlin 1965 performance

 Erwin und Elmire (Johann Wolfgang von Goethe, 1773)
 1916 music by Othmar Schoeck, Op. 25

 L'Esprit triomphant (Romain Rolland)
 music by Alexander Tcherepnin (died 1977)

 Eugene Onegin (Alexander Pushkin, 1825–32)
 1936 music by Sergei Prokofiev, Op. 71

 The Eumenides: Part III of Oresteia (see below)

F
 Le faiseur (Mercadet ou le faiseur; Honoré de Balzac, 1848)
 1935 music by Darius Milhaud, Op. 145

 Faust (Johann Wolfgang von Goethe, 1806–1832)
 1835 music by Julius Rietz
 1876 music by Eduard Lassen
 1908 music by Max von Schillings, Op. 24
 1908 music by Felix Weingartner, Op. 43
 1928 music by Franz Salmhofer (died 1975)
 1949 music by Mátyás Seiber

 Faust and the Town (Anatoly Lunacharsky)
 music by Maximilian Steinberg (died 1946)

 The Feast at Solhaug (Henrik Ibsen, 1856)
 1890 music by Hans Pfitzner

 Fidlovačka aneb Žádný hněv a žádná rvačka (Fidlovačka, or No Anger and No Brawl; Josef Kajetán Tyl, 1834)
 music by František Škroup; it includes the song Kde domov můj? which later became the unofficial national anthem of Czechoslovakia

 Le Fils des étoiles (Joséphin Péladan, 1892)
 music by Erik Satie

 The Flies (Les Mouches; Jean-Paul Sartre, 1943)
 1947 music by Norman Demuth

 La Foi (Eugène Brieux)
 1909 music by Camille Saint-Saëns

 La Folle de Chaillot (Jean Giraudoux, 1945)
 music by Henri Sauguet

 The Foresters (Alfred, Lord Tennyson, 1892)
 music by Arthur Sullivan

 The Forrigan Reel (James Bridie)
 music by Cedric Thorpe Davie

 Les Fourberies de Scapin (Molière, 1667)
 1949 music by Henri Sauguet

 The Frogs (Aristophanes, 405 BC)
 1891 music by Sir Hubert Parry

G
 Gala Gay (Bertolt Brecht)
 1951 music by Alexandre Tansman

 Le Gascon (Théodore Barrière, 1873)
 music by Jacques Offenbach

 Gijsbreght van Aemstel (Joost van den Vondel)
 1912 music by Alphons Diepenbrock

 The Glass of Water (Le verre d'eau; Eugène Scribe, 1842)
 music by Vissarion Shebalin

 Grettir the Strong (Louis MacNeice)
 music by Mátyás Seiber (died 1960)

 Gurre (Holger Drachmann, 1899)
 music by Johan Halvorsen, Op. 17 (died 1935)

H
 Hail, Spain (Alexander Afinogenov)
 1936 music by Dmitri Shostakovich, Op. 44

 La Haine (Hatred, Victorien Sardou, 1874)
 music by Jacques Offenbach

 Hamlet (William Shakespeare, c. 1601)
 1779 music by Georg Joseph "Abbé" Vogler
 1834 music by Julius Rietz
 1891 music by Pyotr Ilyich Tchaikovsky, Op. 67a
 1904 music by Norman O'Neill, Op. 13
 music by Wilhelm Stenhammar (died 1927)
 1932 music by Dmitri Shostakovich, Op. 32 (also 1954)
 1934 music by Cemal Reşit Rey
 music by Gabriel Pierné (died 1937)
 1938 music by Sergei Prokofiev, Op. 77
 1938 music by Virgil Thomson
 1954 music by Dmitri Shostakovich (also 1932)
 music by Heinz Tiessen, Op. 30 (died 1971)

 Hannele (Gerhart Hauptmann, 1893)
 music by Alexander Tcherepnin (died 1977)

 Hassan (James Elroy Flecker, 1922)
 1920 music by Frederick Delius; first performed 1923

 Hécube (Richaud, after Euripides' Hecuba, 424 BC)
 1937 music by Darius Milhaud, Op. 177

 Die Heilige aus U.S.A. (Stefan Zweig)
 1932 music by Ernst Toch

 Hélène (Paul Delair)
 music by André Messager, 1891

 Hélène de Sparte (Emile Verhaeren)
 music by Josef Bohuslav Foerster, Op. 116

 Henry VIII (William Shakespeare, c. 1603)
 1877 music by Arthur Sullivan
 1949 music by Cedric Thorpe Davie

 Die Hermannsschlacht (Heinrich von Kleist, 1809)
 music by Heinrich Marschner

 Hippolytus (Euripides)
 1950 music by Norman Demuth

 L'histoire de Tobie et Sarah (Paul Claudel)
 1968 music by Darius Milhaud, Op. 426

 The House of Aspen (Sir Walter Scott)
 1829 music by John Thomson

 The House of Bernarda Alba (Federico García Lorca, 1936)
 1947 music by Darius Milhaud, Op. 280 (La maison de Bernarda Alba)

 The Human Comedy (La Comédie humaine; Honoré de Balzac)
 1934 music by Dmitri Shostakovich, Op. 37

 Die Hussiten vor Naumburg (August von Kotzebue)
 1802 music by Georg Joseph "Abbé" Vogler
 1803 music by Antonio Salieri

I
 The Indian Queen (Sir Robert Howard and John Dryden, 1664)
 1664 music by John Banister the elder
 1695 music by Henry Purcell, to an expanded version of the play

 The Inventor and the Comedians (Mark Daniel, 1938–39)
 1938 music by Dmitry Kabalevsky (arranged 1940 into a concert suite, The Comedians)

 Intermezzo (Jean Giraudoux)
 1933 music by Francis Poulenc

 The Italian Straw Hat (Le chapeau de paille d'Italie; Eugène Marin Labiche and Marc Michel, 1851)
 1920 music by Yuri Shaporin
 1926 music by Randall Thompson (The Straw Hat; written for piano)

J
 Les Jacobites (François Coppée, 1885)
 music by Charles-Marie Widor

 Jacobowsky and the Colonel (Franz Werfel)
 1944 music by Paul Bowles

 Jedermann (Hugo von Hofmannsthal, 1912; adapted from the 15th-century English morality play Everyman)
 1916 music by Jean Sibelius, Op. 83

 Jérusalem à Carpentras (Lunel)
 1966 music by Darius Milhaud, Op. 419

 Le jeu de Robin et Marion (after Adam de la Halle)
 1948 music by Darius Milhaud, Op. 288

 Johnson over Jordan (J. B. Priestley)
 1939 music by Benjamin Britten
 1947 music by Peter Tranchell

 Judith (Jean Giraudoux, 1931)
 1961 music by Darius Milhaud, Op. 392

 Julius Caesar (William Shakespeare, 1599)
  1936 music by Darius Milhaud, Op. 158

K
 Kätchen von Heilbronn (Heinrich von Kleist, 1808)
 1905 music by Hans Pfitzner

 The King (Bjørnstjerne Bjørnson)
 music by Johan Halvorsen, Op. 19 (died 1935)

 King Arthur (J. Comyns Carr, 1895)
 music by Arthur Sullivan

 King Christian II (Adolf Paul, 1898)
 1898 music by Jean Sibelius, Op. 27

 King Lear (William Shakespeare, c. 1605)
 music by Heinrich Schulz-Beuthen (died 1915; he later used this material in his Symphony No. 6 with men's chorus)
 1920 music by Yuri Shaporin
 1936 music by Cemal Reşit Rey
 1940 music by Dmitri Shostakovich, Op. 58a
 1958 music by Aram Khachaturian
 music by Franz Salmhofer (died 1975)

 King Stephen (August von Kotzebue)
 1811 music by Ludwig van Beethoven, Op. 117
 King Svätopluk (Ivan Stodola, 1931)
 1936 music by Eugen Suchoň

 Kirschblütenfest (Klabund)
 1930 music by Ernst Toch

 A Klingon Christmas Carol (Christopher Kidder-Mostrom, Sasha Walloch, 2007)
 2010 music by Mike Hallenbeck; 2011-2013 music by Jon Silpayamanant

 Königskinder (The King's Children; Ernst Rosmer (Elsa Bernstein-Porges), 1895)
 1897 music by Engelbert Humperdinck (he wrote an opera on the same subject in 1910)

 Kronbruden (The Crown Bride; August Strindberg, 1900)
 1913 music by August Enna

 Kuolema (Death; Arvid Järnefelt, 1903, revised 1911)
 1903 music by Jean Sibelius
the music was revised in 1904, 1906 and 1911, and the original six numbers as presented in 1903 no longer exist
 Valse triste (originally Op. 44; since 1973 it has been numbered Op. 44, No. 1), one of Sibelius's most famous pieces, came from the 1904 revision
Canzonetta, Op. 62a, was performed for the first time in 1911, but it had been written in 1906, in a different version, as Rondino der Liebenden, adapted from the original music
 Valse romantique, Op. 62b, was specially composed for the 1911 version of the play
 the remaining extant piece, Scene with Cranes, was a combining and revision of two numbers from the original score; it was written and performed in 1906, but it did not form part of the 1911 incidental music, and was published posthumously only in 1973, as Op. 44, No. 2.

L
 The Language of Birds (Adolf Paul, 1911)
 music by Jean Sibelius

 Léocadia (Time Remembered, Jean Anouilh, 1940)
 music by Francis Poulenc

 Leonce and Lena (Georg Büchner, 1836)
 1931 music by Franz Syberg (Leonce og Lena)
 1941 music by Henri Sauguet (Léonce et Léna; play adapted by Michel J. Arnaud)
 music by Mátyás Seiber (died 1960)

 The Libation Bearers: Part II of Oresteia (see below)
 Life is a Dream (La vida es sueño; Pedro Calderón de la Barca)
 1930 music by Leevi Madetoja, Op. 75

 The Little Minister (J. M. Barrie, 1897)
 music by Sir Alexander Mackenzie, Op. 57

 The Lizard (Ödlan; Mikael Lybeck 1864-1925)
 1909 music by Jean Sibelius, Op. 8

 Lodolezzi sjunger (Bo Bergman)
 music by Wilhelm Stenhammar (died 1927)

Love's Labour's Lost (William Shakespeare)
music by Gerald Finzi, Op. 28

 Lucifer (Joost van den Vondel. 1654)
 1940 music bt Sándor Veress

 Lucky Peter's Travels (aka The Journey of Fortunate Peter; August Strindberg)
 1910 music by Josef Bohuslav Foerster, Op. 116a

 Lysistrata (Aristophanes, 411 BC)
 1908 music by Engelbert Humperdinck

M
 Macbeth (William Shakespeare, c. 1605)
 1825 music by Louis Spohr, Op. 75
 1834 music by Julius Rietz
 1888 music by Arthur Sullivan
 1920 music by Johan Halvorsen
 1933 music by Aram Khachaturian (also 1955)
 1936 music by Cemal Reşit Rey
 1936 music by Virgil Thomson (for the Orson Welles production)
 1937 music by Darius Milhaud, Op. 175
 1942 music by William Walton
 music by Boris Asafyev (died 1949)
 1949 music by Norman Demuth
 1949 music by Peter Tranchell
 1955 music by Aram Khachaturian (also 1933)

 Madame Bovary (Gustave Flaubert, 1856; novel)
 music by Dmitri Kabalevsky

 The Maid of Orleans (Die Jungfrau von Orleans; Friedrich Schiller, 1801)
 music by August Söderman

 The Maid of Pskov (Lev Mei)
 1877 music by Nikolai Rimsky-Korsakov, rev. 1882 (a different work than his opera on the same subject)

 Le Malade imaginaire (Molière, 1673)
 music by Ludomir Różycki

 Manfred (Lord Byron, c. 1817)
 1849 music by Robert Schumann, Op. 115 (produced 1852)
 1898 music by Sir Alexander Mackenzie, Op. 58 (not produced)

 Margot (Édouard Bourdet)
 1935 music by Georges Auric and Francis Poulenc

 Les Mariés de la Tour Eiffel (The Wedding on the Eiffel Tower; Jean Cocteau)
 1921 music by Georges Auric, Arthur Honegger, Darius Milhaud, Francis Poulenc, and Germaine Tailleferre, orchestrated by Marius Constant

 Mariotta (Carl Borgaard, based on a comedy by Eugène Scribe)
 1850 music by Niels Gade

 Marmion (Robert Buchanan, based on Sir Walter Scott's poem Marmion, 1808)
 1891 music by Sir Alexander Mackenzie, Op. 43

 The Marriage of Figaro (Pierre Beaumarchais, 1778)
 1935 music by Yuri Shaporin

 Mary Stuart (Friedrich Schiller, 1800)
 music by Vissarion Shebalin

 Masquerade (Mikhail Lermontov, 1835)
 music by Vissarion Shebalin
 1941 music by Aram Khachaturian

 Masse Mensch (Ernst Toller, 1921)
 music by Heinz Tiessen (died 1971)

 Le massere (Carlo Goldoni, 1755)
 1993 music by Lorenzo Ferrero

 Master Olof (August Strindberg, 1872)
 music by Tor Aulin (died 1914)

 The Mayor of Zalamea (El Alcalde de Zalamea; Pedro Calderón de la Barca)
 1836 music by Julius Rietz

 Measure for Measure (William Shakespeare, c. 1604)
 music by Dmitri Kabalevsky

 Medea (Euripides, 431 BC)
 1843 music by Wilhelm Taubert
 1938 music by Sándor Veress
 1942 music by Marios Varvoglis

 Le Médecin volant (Vildrae, after Molière, 1645)
 1937 music by Darius Milhaud, Op. 165

 Médée (Jean Anouilh, 1946)
 1948 music by Norman Demuth

 The Merchant (Mercator; Plautus)
 1950 music by İlhan Usmanbaş (for 2 flutes)

 The Merchant of Venice (William Shakespeare. c. 1597)
 1871 music by Arthur Sullivan
 1905 music by Engelbert Humperdinck
 1917 music by Henri Rabaud
 music by Johan Halvorsen (died 1935)
 music by Boris Asafyev (died 1949)
 1950 music by Peter Tranchell
 music by Ludomir Różycki (died 1953)

 Merlin (Karl Leberecht Immermann, 1831)
 music by Heinz Tiessen (died 1971)

 The Merry Wives of Windsor (William Shakespeare, c. 1600)
 1874 music by Arthur Sullivan
 music by Franz Salmhofer (died 1975)

 Michael Strogoff (Jules Verne and Adolphe D'Ennery; an adaptation of Verne's 1876 novel)
 1880 music by Jules Massenet

 A Midsummer Night's Dream (William Shakespeare, c. 1595)
 music by Felix Mendelssohn  (overture 1826; remaining music 1843, including the Wedding March)
 music by Erik Satie (1915, 5 numbers entitled Grimaces, unproduced)
 music by Carl Orff (1917-39; revised 1962)

 The Mighty Magician (El Mágico prodigioso; Pedro Calderón de la Barca)
 music by Josef Rheinberger

 The Miserly Knight (Alexander Pushkin, 1830)
 music by Vissarion Shebalin

 The Misanthrope (Molière, 1666)
 1950 music by Norman Demuth

 Mother Courage and Her Children (Bertolt Brecht, 1939)
 1959 music by Darius Milhaud, Op. 379 (Mother Courage)

 Mozart and Salieri (Alexander Pushkin, 1830)
 music by Vissarion Shebalin

 Much Ado About Nothing (William Shakespeare, c. 1598)
 1915 music by Johan Halvorsen

N
 La nave (Gabriele d'Annunzio)
 1905 music by Ildebrando Pizzetti

 Navidad (Gregorio Martínez Sierra)
 1916 music by Joaquín Turina

 Nie-Boska komedia (Zygmunt Krasiński)
 music by Ludomir Różycki

 The Noble's Nest (Liza; Ivan Turgenev, 1859 novel)
 1940 music by Yuri Shaporin

 No More Peace (Nie wieder Friede; Ernst Toller, 1934)
 music by Herbert Murrill

 Notre-Dame de Paris (Victor Hugo, adapted from his 1831 novel)
 1879 music by Jules Massenet
 music by Anatoly Nikolayevich Alexandrov (died 1982)

O
 The Oath of the Dead (Zacharias Papantoniou)
 1938 music by Marios Varvoglis

 Oedipus at Colonus (Sophocles, c. 406 BC)
 1845 music by Felix Mendelssohn
 1936 music by Ildebrando Pizzetti

 Oedipus, a Tragedy (John Dryden and Nathaniel Lee, 1679; based on Sophocles)
 1692 music by Henry Purcell, Z. 583, including Music for a while
 Oedipus Rex (Oedipus Tyrannus or Oedipus the King; Sophocles, 429 BC)
 1852 music by Franz Lachner
 1881 music by John Knowles Paine
 1887 music by Charles Villiers Stanford, Op. 29
 music by Alexander Ilyinsky (died 1920)
 1936 music by Leevi Madetoja
 1941 music by Virgil Thomson

 Old Spain (Montagu Slater)
 1938 music by Benjamin Britten

 Ondine (Jean Giraudoux, 1939)
 music by Henri Sauguet

 On ne badine pas avec l'amour (Alfred de Musset, 1834)
 1917 music by Camille Saint-Saëns

 On the Frontier (W. H. Auden and Christopher Isherwood, 1938)
 music by Benjamin Britten

 Oresteia (Aeschylus, trilogy, 458 BC)
 1900 music by Max von Schillings, Op. 12
 Part I - Agamemnon
 1900 music by Sir Hubert Parry
 1914 music by Darius Milhaud, Op. 14
 1930 music by Ildebrando Pizzetti
 1932 music by Marios Varvoglis
 Part II - The Libation Bearers
 1915 music by Darius Milhaud (Les choëphores, Op. 24)
 Part III - The Eumenides
 1885 music by Charles Villiers Stanford, Op. 23
 1923 music by Darius Milhaud, Op. 41

 Othello (William Shakespeare, c. 1603)
 music by Franz Salmhofer (died 1975)
 music by Clifton Parker (died 1989)

 L'Ours et la Lune (The Bear and the Moon; Paul Claudel)
 1918 music by Darius Milhaud

P
 Peer Gynt (Henrik Ibsen, 1876)
 1876 music by Edvard Grieg, from which he later derived two orchestral suites, Opp. 46 (1888), 55 (1891)
 1948 music by Harald Sæverud, Op. 28

 Pelléas and Mélisande (Maurice Maeterlinck, 1893)
 1898 music by Gabriel Fauré, Op. 80
 1905 music by Jean Sibelius, Op. 46

 The Persians (Aeschylus, 472 BC)
 1934 music by Marios Varvoglis
 1940 music by Henri Sauguet

 Un petit ange de rien du tout (C. A. Puget)
 1940 music by Darius Milhaud, Op. 215

 Phaëton, or Reckless Audacity (Joost van den Vondel, 1663)
 1937 music by Willem Pijper

 La Pharmacienne (Jean Giraudoux)
 1949 music by Henri Sauguet

 Phèdre (Jean Racine, 1677)
 1900 music by Jules Massenet

 Philip II (Emile Verhaeren)
 1918 music by Eugene Goossens, Op. 22

 Philoctetes (Sophocles, c. 409 BC)
 music by Alexander Ilyinsky (died 1920)

 Le Piège de Méduse (Erik Satie, 1913)
 music also by Erik Satie; sometimes described as an operetta

 La Pisanella (Gabriele d'Annunzio)
 1913 music by Ildebrando Pizzetti

 Pizarro (Richard Brinsley Sheridan, 1799)
 music by Jan Ladislav Dussek (with Michael Kelly)

 Plutus (Jollivet, after Aristophanes, 380 BC)
 1938 music by Darius Milhaud, Op. 186

 Polyeucte (Pierre Corneille, 1642)
 1881 music by Edgar Tinel (an orchestral suite was produced in 1906)

La Porte héroïque du ciel (Jules Bois, 1894)
 music by Erik Satie (Prélude, 1894)

 The Post Office (Rabindranath Tagore, 1912)
 music by Heinz Tiessen (died 1971)

 Preciosa (Pius Alexander Wolff, based on Miguel de Cervantes' La gitanella; 1821)
 1820 music by Carl Maria von Weber, Op. 78, J. 279

 Prince Potemkin (Kniaź Patiomkin; Tadeusz Miciński, 1906)
 1924 music by Karol Szymanowski, Op. 51

 The Princess of Cyprus (Zachris Topelius)
 music by Fredrik Pacius (died 1891)

 Princess Dandelion (Jaroslav Kvapil)
 1897 music by Josef Bohuslav Foerster, Op. 35

 La Princesse Lointaine (Edmond Rostand, 1895)
 1897 music by Gabriel Pierné

 Princess Maleine (La princesse Maleine; Maurice Maeterlinck, 1889)
 music by Lili Boulanger (died 1918; she also worked on an opera on the same subject, which was not finished)
 music by Maximilian Steinberg (died 1946)

 Prinz Friedrich von Homburg (The Prince of Homburg; Heinrich von Kleist, 1811)
 1884 music by Hugo Wolf (unfinished)

 Prometheus Bound (Aeschylus, c. 415 BC)
 1948 music by Norman Demuth

 Prometheus Unbound (Percy Bysshe Shelley, 1820)
 1948 music by Norman Demuth
 music by Lars-Erik Larsson (died 1986)

 Protée (Paul Claudel)
 1919 music by Darius Milhaud, Op. 17 (also 1955)
 1955 music by Darius Milhaud, Op. 341 (also 1919)

Q
 Le Quatorze Juillet (Romain Rolland, 1902)
 1936 music by Georges Auric, Arthur Honegger, Jacques Ibert, Charles Koechlin, Lazarus, Darius Milhaud (Op. 153) and Albert Roussel

 Queen Mary (Alfred, Lord Tennyson)
 1876 music by Charles Villiers Stanford, Op. 6

 Queen Tamara; Knut Hamsun, 1903)
 music by Johan Halvorsen (died 1935)

R
 Rache des verhöbten Liebhabers (Ernst Toller)
 music by Ernst Krenek

 Raduz and Mahulena (Julius Zeyer)
 1898 music by Josef Suk, Op. 13; rev. 1912; in 1900 he reworked the music as an orchestral piece, A Fairy Tale, Op. 16

 Ramuntcho (Pierre Loti, 1897)
 1908 music by Gabriel Pierné

 Ravenswood (Herman Merrivale 1890, based on Sir Walter Scott's 1819 novel The Bride of Lammermoor)
 1890 music by Sir Alexander Mackenzie, Op. 45

 Regina von Emmeritz (Zachris Topelius)
 music by August Söderman (died 1876)

 La Reine Fiammette (Catulle Mendès, 1898)
 music by Paul Vidal

 Le retour de l'enfant prodigue (André Gide, written 1907 as a novel)
 1933 music by Henri Sauguet

 Rhesus (attrib. Euripides)
 1922 music by Ernest Walker, Op. 35

 Richard III (William Shakespeare, c. 1591)
 music by August Söderman (died 1876)
 music by Robert Volkmann (died 1883; overture, Op. 68; interludes, Op. 73)

 The Robbers (Friedrich Schiller, 1781)
 1782 music by Franz Danzi
 1919 music by Yuri Shaporin
 music by Vissarion Shebalin

 Romeo and Juliet (William Shakespeare, c. 1595)
 1890 music by Francis Thomé
 1907 music by Engelbert Humperdinck
 music by Wilhelm Stenhammar (died 1927)
 1936 music by Darius Milhaud, Op. 161 (S. Jollivet, after Jouve, after Shakespeare)
 music by Richard Strauss (died 1949)
 music by Franz Salmhofer (died 1975)
 music by Anatoly Nikolayevich Alexandrov (died 1982)

 Rosamunde (Helmina von Chézy, 1823)
 music by Franz Schubert, Op. 26, D. 797

 The Royal Hunt of the Sun (Peter Shaffer, 1964)
music for original production by Marc Wilkinson

 The Ruins of Athens (August von Kotzebue)
 1811 music by Ludwig van Beethoven, Op. 113, including the Turkish March
 1924 Richard Strauss made his own arrangement of Beethoven's music
 Ruy Blas (Victor Hugo)
 1839 music by Felix Mendelssohn

S
 St. Jakob an der Birs (C.A. (August) Bernoulli)
 music by Hermann Suter, Op. 13

 Salome (Oscar Wilde, 1893)
 1918 music by Sir Granville Bantock ("Dance of the Seven Veils")
 music by Flor Alpaerts (died 1954)
 music by Alexander Tcherepnin (died 1977)

 La Samaritaine (Edmond Rostand, 1897)
 music by Gabriel Pierné

 Samson (Jaroslav Vrchlický)
 1906 music by Josef Bohuslav Foerster, Op.62

 Saül (André Gide, 1903)
 1954 music by Darius Milhaud, Op. 334

 Scaramouche (Poul Knudsen; tragic pantomime)
 1913 music by Jean Sibelius, Op. 71 (first performed 1922)

 The School for Scandal (Richard Brinsley Sheridan, 1777)
 1940 music by Henri Sauguet (play adapted by Claude Spaak as L'École de médisance)
 music by Dmitri Kabalevsky (died 1987)

 The Searcher (Velona Pilcher)
 1930 music by Edmund Rubbra

 The Seven Ages of Man (Montagu Slater)
 1938 music by Benjamin Britten

 Snefrid (Holger Drachmann)
 1893 music by Carl Nielsen, FS. 17; rev. 1899

 The Snow Maiden (Snegurochka, Aleksandr Ostrovsky, 1873)
 1873 music by Pyotr Ilyich Tchaikovsky, Op. 12
 music by Alexander Gretchaninov, Op. 23

 The Spanish Student (Henry Wadsworth Longfellow, 1843)
 music by Charles Villiers Stanford (died 1924)

 Der Spiegelmensch (Franz Werfel)
 music by Wilhelm Grosz, Op. 12

 The Starlight Express (Violet Peam, 1915)
 music by Edward Elgar

 The Stone Guest (Alexander Pushkin, 1830)
 music by Vissarion Shebalin

 Swanwhite (Svanevhit; August Strindberg)
 1908 music by Jean Sibelius, Op. 54

 Sweeney Agonistes (T. S. Eliot, 1932)
 music by Quincy Porter

T
 Tartuffe (Molière, 1664)
 1929 music by Yuri Shaporin
 1950 music (fanfares) by Henri Sauguet

 The Tempest (William Shakespeare, 1611)
 original music by Robert Johnson
 c. 1695 music by Henry Purcell, Z. 631 (semi-opera)
 1855 music by Wilhelm Taubert
 1862 music by Arthur Sullivan, Op. 1
 1882 music by Frank Van der Stucken
 1888 music by Ernest Chausson
 1915 music by Engelbert Humperdinck
 1918 music by Felix Weingartner, Op. 65
 1921 music by Arthur Bliss
 1926 music by Jean Sibelius, Op. 109
 1930 music by Willem Pijper
 1946 music by Lennox Berkeley
 music by Heinz Tiessen (died 1971)
 music by Franz Salmhofer (died 1975)

 Thamos, King of Egypt (Thamos, König in Ägypten; Tobias Phillip, 1774)
 1773-1780 music by Wolfgang Amadeus Mozart

 Théodora (Victorien Sardou, 1884)
 music by Jules Massenet

 This Way to the Tomb (Ronald Duncan, 1945)
 music by Benjamin Britten

 Timon of Athens (William Shakespeare, before 1623)
 music by August Söderman (died 1876)

 Toad of Toad Hall (A. A. Milne, 1929; based on Kenneth Grahame's book The Wind in the Willows)
 music by Harold Fraser-Simson

 To Damascus (trilogy, aka Till Damascus; August Strindberg, 1898–1902)
 1927 music by Ture Rangström
 Part III.
 1916 music by Emil von Reznicek

 Der Tor und der Tod (Hugo von Hofmannsthal, 1891)
 1908 music by Josef Bohuslav Foerster, Op. 75

 Tordenskjold (Jacob Breda Bull)
 music by Johan Halvorsen, Op. 18 (died 1935)

 The Trachiniae (Sophocles)
 1932 music by Ildebrando Pizzetti

 The Trojan Women (Euripides, 415 BC)
 1940 music by Virgil Thomson

 Tsar Boris (Aleksey Konstantinovich Tolstoy, 1870)
 1899 music by Vasily Kalinnikov

 Tsar Fiodor Ioannovich (Aleksey Konstantinovich Tolstoy, 1868)
 music by Alexander Ilyinsky (died 1920)

 Tsongor és Tünde (aka Csongor és Tünde; Mihály Vörösmarty)
 1903 music by Leo Weiner, Op. 10
 1941 music by Ferenc Farkas

 Turandot (Carlo Gozzi, 1762)
 1809 music by Carl Maria von Weber, Op. 37 (for the 1801 translation Turandot, Prinzessin von China by Friedrich Schiller)
 1905 music by Ferruccio Busoni (used for the adaptation and translation by Karl Vollmöller produced in 1911 by Max Reinhardt)
 music by Wilhelm Stenhammar (died 1927)

 Twelfth Night (William Shakespeare, c. 1601)
 1885 music by Charles-Marie Widor (to a French version, Conte d'avril)
 1907 music by Engelbert Humperdinck
 music by Wilhelm Stenhammar (died 1927)

 Twigs (George Furth, 1971)
 music by Stephen Sondheim

U
 Under the Apple Trees (Pod jabloni; Julius Zeyer)
 1902 music by Josef Suk, Op. 20; produced 1934

 Die unheilbringende Krone (Ferdinand Raimund)
 music by Josef Rheinberger

V
 Verschwender (Ferdinand Raimund)
 music by Conradin Kreutzer

 Die versunkene Glocke (Gerhart Hauptmann, 1897)
 music by Wilhelm Grosz, Op. 35

 Volpone (Ben Jonson, 1606)
 music by Mátyás Seiber (to a German version translated by Stefan Zweig

 Le voyageur sans bagage (Jean Anouilh, 1937)
 1937 music by Darius Milhaud, Op. 157
 1944 music by Francis Poulenc

 The Voyevoda (A Dream on the Volga) (Aleksandr Ostrovsky): see A Dream on the VolgaW
 Wallensteins Lager (Friedrich Schiller)
 1800 music by Johann Philipp Christian Schulz

 War and Peace (Leo Tolstoy, novel, 1865–1869)
 music for a dramatic adaptation by Clifton Parker (died 1989)

 The Wasps (Aristophanes, 422 BC)
 1909 music by Ralph Vaughan Williams

 Where the Rainbow Ends (Clifford Mills and John Ramsey, 1911)
 music by Roger Quilter

 The Widow from Valencia (Lope de Vega)
 music by Aram Khachaturian

 Wilhelm Tell (Friedrich Schiller, 1804)
 1806 music by Franz Danzi
 music by Carl Reinecke (died 1910)
 1926 music by Paul Müller, Op. 13
 music by Lars-Erik Larsson (died 1986)

 The Winter's Tale (William Shakespeare, 1594–1611)
 1906 music by Engelbert Humperdinck
 music by Nikolay Sokolov, Op. 44 (died 1922)
 1950 music by Darius Milhaud, Op. 306 (C. A. Puget, after Shakespeare)

 The Wood Nymph (Josef Kajetán Tyl)
 music by Karel Kovařovic (died 1920)

 Woyzeck (Georg Büchner, 1836; unfinished, completed by others)
 music by Mátyás Seiber (died 1960; as Wozzeck)

X
 Xantho chez les courtisanes (Jean Richepin)
 music by Xavier Leroux

Y
 Yelva'' (Eugène Scribe)
 1832 music by Albert Lortzing

References

 
incidental music